The Asian Men's Volleyball Challenge Cup, also known as the AVC Men's Challenge Cup, is an international volleyball competition in Asia and Oceania contested by the bottom senior men's national teams of the members of Asian Volleyball Confederation (AVC), the sport's continent governing body. The tournaments have been awarded every two years since 2018. The current champion is Kyrgyzstan, which won its first title at the 2022 tournament.

The 2 Asian Volleyball Challenge Cup tournaments have been won by two different national teams. Both Iraq and Kyrgyzstan have won one time.

The 2018 Asian Challenge Cup took place in Cholpon-Ata, Kyrgyzstan.

This event should not be confused with the other, more prestigious, continental competition for Asian national volleyball teams, the Asian Volleyball Championship and Asian Volleyball Cup.

Results summary

Teams reaching the top four

Champions by region

Hosts
List of hosts by number of challenge cups hosted.

Medal summary

Participating nations
Legend
 – Champions
 – Runners-up
 – Third place
 – Fourth place
 – Did not enter / Did not qualify
 – Hosts
Q – Qualified for forthcoming tournament

Debut of teams

Awards

See also
 Asian Women's Volleyball Challenge Cup
 Asian Men's Volleyball Cup
 Asian Men's Volleyball Championship
 Volleyball at the Asian Games
 Asian Men's U23 Volleyball Championship
 Asian Men's U20 Volleyball Championship
 Asian Boys' U18 Volleyball Championship

References

External links
 Asian Volleyball Confederation – official website

 
Asian Volleyball Challenge Cup
V
International volleyball competitions
International men's volleyball competitions
Volleyball competitions in Asia
Biennial sporting events
2018 establishments in Asia
Asian Volleyball Confederation competitions